The Blue Andalusian, is a breed of domestic chicken indigenous to the autonomous community of Andalusia in south-west Spain. It is distributed through much of the countryside of Córdoba and Seville, and is concentrated particularly in the area of Utrera, which is considered the heartland of the breed. In 2009 the population was estimated at  birds.

A very different type of Andalusian, more intensely blue and with blue-laced plumage, was created in England from birds imported from Andalusia through selective breeding and cross-breeding with birds of other breeds.

History 

There is little information on the early history of the Andalusian. Blue chickens from Andalusia were imported to England no later than 1851. The creation of the "international" type of Andalusian, with blue-laced plumage, is attributed to the English, whether in Andalusia or in Britain. Two breeders in particular are thought to have started this process, which took many years: one named Coles, from Fareham, Hampshire, and a certain John Taylor of Shepherd's Bush, in west London. Another claimant was Augusta Legge who was the countess of Dartmouth. Andalusians were shown at Baker Street, London, in January 1853; they were not included in the original Standard of Excellence in 1865.

Andalusians reached the United States in about 1850–1855, and were included in the first edition of the Standard of Perfection of the American Poultry Association in 1874. The breed arrived in South America in 1870, and was first shown in Germany in the same year. A bantam was created in the 1880s.

Characteristics 

The slate-blue plumage of the Andalusian is caused by a dilution gene, which, in combination with the E gene for black plumage, produces partial dilution of the melanin which gives the black colour. Not all Andalusians are blue: birds with two copies of the gene have near-total dilution, and are off-white; birds with no copies have no dilution, and are black; those with one copy have partial dilution, and are blue. Blue birds occur, in Mendelian proportion, twice as often as each of the other colours. All are present in the population.

The earlobes of the Andalusian are smooth, white, and almond-shaped; the crest is single and of medium size, with five well-defined points. The skin is white and the legs and feet are black.

Use 

Andaluza Azul hens lay about 165 white eggs per year; eggs weigh . Blue-bred white hens lay the largest eggs.

References 

Conservation Priority Breeds of the Livestock Conservancy
Chicken breeds originating in Spain
Animal breeds on the RBST Watchlist
Animal breeds on the GEH Red List
Chicken breeds